Berteling may refer to
Ron Berteling (born 1957), Dutch ice hockey player
Ron Berteling Schaal, the opening game of the Dutch ice hockey league
Berteling Building, a historic commercial building in Indiana, U.S.